Kamaniskeg Lake is a lake in the municipalities of Hastings Highlands, Hastings County, and Madawaska Valley, Renfrew County, in Southern Ontario, Canada. It is part of the Ottawa River drainage basin and is located in the Madawaska River Valley, with nearby communities of Barry's Bay and Combermere. The lake is known for its simple beauty, with a mixture of forest, and rock and sand beaches.

Geography
Kamaniskeg Lake is part of the Ottawa River drainage basin with the communities of Barry's Bay at its northern end, and Combermere near the southeast. The Dispersed Rural Community of Barrymere is on the lake at the southeast end. The southern two thirds of the lake is in geographic Bangor Township in Hastings Highlands, Hastings County; the northern one third is in geographic Sherwood Township, and the southeastern tip in geographic Radcliffe Township, both townships in Madawaska Valley, Renfrew County.

The Madawaska River, known for its rapids, is the primary inflow, at the west, and outflow, from the southeast. There are also three other named creek inflows: Biernacki Creek, Carson Creek and Purdy Creek.

History
The lake's name is derived from the Ojibwe Gaa-miniskeg zaaga'igan meaning "lake of many islands". The lake holds the wreck of the Mayflower, a paddle steamer which sank in 1912.

Transportation
Renfrew County Road 62 runs to the east of the lake between Barry's Bay and Combermere, and connects to Ontario Highway 60 at the north end at Barry's Bay.

The Kamaniskeg Lake Water Aerodrome, a seaplane base, is on the southeast of lake.

Tributaries
clockwise from the Madawaska River outflow
Purdy Creek
Madawaska River
Carson Creek
Biernacki Creek

See also
List of lakes in Ontario

References

Lakes of Renfrew County